Peter Grandbois (April 3, 1964) is an American writer, editor, academic, and fencing coach.

Biography 

Peter Grandbois received a B.A. from the University of Colorado—Boulder (1986, cum laude), an MA from the University of Colorado—Boulder (1991), an MFA from Bennington College (2003), and a PhD from the University of Denver (2006). He was an assistant professor at Sacramento State University for four years before taking a position at Denison University in 2010 where he is currently a professor of creative writing and contemporary literature. He is the Poetry Editor for Boulevard magazine.

He is also the head coach of the Denison University Women's Fencing Team. They compete in the Eastern Women's Fencing Conference as well as the Central Collegiate Fencing Conference.

Writing 

Known for his work in all four genres, Grandbois is the author of four poetry collections, three novels, three novella collections or "double monster features," two memoirs, two collections of short stories, and several plays produced in New York, Los Angeles, St. Louis, and Columbus. His poems, short stories, essays, and reviews have appeared in numerous journals and magazines, including: Boulevard, The Denver Quarterly, The Gettysburg Review, The Kenyon Review, The Normal School, North Dakota Quarterly, and Prairie Schooner.

His first novel, The Gravedigger, has been translated into Polish and is currently under contract to be filmed in Mexico.

Awards

Winner of the 2020 Snyder Prize from Ashland Poetry Press for Last Night I Aged a Hundred Years
Finalist for the 2019 Foreword INDIES in the category of Best Multicultural Fiction for half-burnt
Notable Essay in The Best American Essays 2019 for "Pain," which first appeared in Broad Street
Notable Essay in The Best American Essays 2018 for "Passion," which first appeared in Mount Hope
Honorable Mention for the 2017 Foreword INDIES in the Poetry category for This House That
Notable Essay in The Best American Essays 2017 for "Honor," which first appeared in the North Dakota Quarterly.
The Woman Who Was Me, nominated for five New York Innovative Theatre Awards, including: Outstanding Premiere Production of a Play and Outstanding Solo Performance, 2017
Winner of the Brighthorse Books Poetry Prize, 2016 for This House That
Silver Medal for the 2015 Foreword IndieFab Awards (now known as the Foreword INDIES) in the Fantasy category for The Girl on the Swing and At Night in Crumbling Voices
Ohio Arts Council Award, 2015
Honorable Mention in Best American Horror, volume 7, ed. by Ellen Datlow, for "The Stability of Large Systems," 2015
Honorable Mention for the 2014 Foreword IndieFab Awards (now known as the Foreword INDIES) in the Fantasy category for The Glob Who Girdled Granville and The Secret Lives of Actors
Winner of the Neil Labute New Theatre Festival, St. Louis, 2013, for "Present Tense" (Co-written with Nancy Bell)
Finalist for the 2013 Foreword Book of the Year Awards (now known as the Foreword INDIES) in the Short Stories category for Domestic Disturbances
 Gold Medal for the 2011 Foreword Book of the Year Awards (now known as the Foreword INDIES) in the Literary Fiction category for Nahoonkara
 Notable Essay in The Best American Essays 2011 for "Driving to Puerto Rico," which first appeared in The Potomac Review.
 Honorable Mention, the Pushcart Prize 2007 for "All or Nothing at the Faberge," which first appeared in Post Road.
 Selected for the Barnes and Noble "Discover Great New Writer's Program" in 2006 for The Gravedigger.

Bibliography

Poetry
 This House That (Brighthorse Books, 2017)
 The Three-Legged World—published as Triptych with books by the poets James McCorkle and Robert Miltner (Etruscan Press, 2020)
 everything has become birds (  Brighthorse Books, 2021)
 Last Night I Aged a Hundred Years (Ashland Poetry Press, 2021)

Novels

 The Gravedigger (Chronicle books, 2006)
 Nahoonkara (Etruscan Press, 2011)
 half-burnt (Spuyten Duyvil, 2019)

Novella collections

 Wait Your Turn and The Stability of Large Systems (Wordcraft of Oregon, 2014)
 The Glob Who Girdled Granville and The Secret Lives of Actors (Wordcraft of Oregon, 2014)
 The Girl on the Swing and At Night in Crumbling Voices (Wordcraft of Oregon, 2015)

Memoir

 The Arsenic Lobster: A Hybrid Memoir (Spuyten Duyvil, 2009)
 Kissing the Lobster (Spuyten Duyvil, 2018)

Short story collections
 Domestic Disturbances (Subito Press, 2013)
 Domestic Bestiary (Spuyten Duyvil, 2023)

Plays

 Mutual Consent--cowritten with Nancy Bell (California Repertory Theatre, Long Beach, CA, 2016
 The Woman Who Was Me (New York, United Solo Theatre Festival, 2014; United Solo Theatre Festival, 2015, Naropa University, Boulder, CO, 2016, and Theatre Lab, New York: 2017 )
 "Present Tense"—a One Act—cowritten with Nancy Bell (St. Louis Actor's Studio, Neil Labute Festival, 2013; The Best of the Neil Labute New Theatre Festival, 59E59 Theatre in New York, 2016)
 "The Call"—a One Act—cowritten with Nancy Bell (MadLab: Columbus, OH 2013;

Translations

 San Juan: Memoir of a City'', by Edgardo Rodriguez Julia (University of Wisconsin, 2007)

References

External links
Interview (2015) with Peter Grandbois in Midwestern Gothic
Interview (2016) with Peter Grandbois in The Penmen Review of Southern New Hampshire University
Interview (2017) Playwright interview with Adam Szymkowicz
Interview (2017) Hollywood Soapbox Interview
Interview (2018) with Deanna Benyo
Interview (2018) Los Angeles Review of Books Interview with Margot Singer

1964 births
Living people
Denison University faculty
Denison University alumni